Walton Hall is a district in Milton Keynes, in the English county of Buckinghamshire, and is the location of the campus and offices of The Open University. The university campus covers 48 hectares and the first buildings were designed by Maxwell Fry and Jane Drew in 1969.

It is in the ancient ecclesiastic and modern civil parish of Walton. The manor house (Walton Hall) that gives the district its name and the ancient parish church of St Michael, now deconsecrated, are in the university's grounds.  The village farm-lands are divided between Walton Hall, the modern Walton, Kents Hill and Walnut Tree.

The manor house itself, built in 1830 in the Regency style for the Pinfold family, is home to the vice-chancellor's offices of the  Open University.

Walton Hall is on the banks of the Ouzel, a tributary of the Great Ouse where Walton Lake, a disused balancing lake, has become naturalised and is home to reeds, bulrushes, reed warbler, reed bunting, water rail, sparrowhawk, kestrel, green woodpecker, grass snake and many varieties of odonata. Surrounding the reedbed are ponds and open water, ancient hedgerows and hay meadow.

References

See also
 Walton, Milton Keynes

Areas of Milton Keynes